Giovanni Hidalgo a.k.a. "Mañenguito" (born November 22, 1963) is a Latin jazz percussionist.

Early years
Hidalgo was born in  San Juan, Puerto Rico, where he received his primary education. His grandfather was a musician, and his father, José Manuel Hidalgo "Mañengue", was a renowned conga player. Hidalgo was raised in a household surrounded by drums, bongos, congas, and timbales. For his eighth birthday, he received a conga which was handmade by his father. As a young child he practiced and developed his skills on the conga and on other instruments in his house. Hidalgo would drum a tune with sticks and then play the same tune with his hands.

Music career
Hidalgo auditioned and was hired by the Batacumbele Band in 1980. In 1981, he traveled with the band to Cuba, where he met a musician by the name José Luis Quintana, a.k.a. Changuito. They created a style of rhythm that ushered in a new era in Latin music.

In 1985, Hidalgo was performing with Eddie Palmieri at the Village Gate in New York City when Dizzy Gillespie walked in and listened to him play. Gillespie was so impressed with Hidalgo that he told him that someday in the future they must get together and play. In 1988 Hidalgo joined Gillespie's United Nation Orchestra.

In 1992, Hidalgo was hired as an adjunct professor at the Berklee College of Music in Boston. He taught many types of rhythm: Puerto Rican, Cuban, Dominican, reggae, African, and jazz. He held this academic position until 1996.

During his career, he has worked with Bola Abimbola, Sikiru Adepoju, Art Blakey, Muruga Booker, Jack Bruce, Don Byron, Candido Camero, D'Angelo, Paulinho da Costa, Steve Gadd, Sammy Hagar, Kip Hanrahan, Zakir Hussain, Cassius Khan, Airto Moreira, Charlie Palmieri, Tito Puente, Hilton Ruiz, Paul Simon, and Carlos "Patato" Valdes.

On October 31, 2010, he performed with the rock band Phish during their Halloween concert. The band performed Waiting for Columbus by Little Feat with Hildalgo on percussion (with the exception of "Don't Bogart That Joint", which was performed a cappella) and a brass section of Aaron Johnson, Stuart Bogie, Ian Hendrickson, Michael Leonhart, and Eric Biondo.

In October 2016, the ring finger of his left hand was amputated due to an infection related to diabetes. In March, 2017 a benefit for him was held at the Lehman Center for the Performing Arts in the Bronx, New York to assist him with his expenses. Since that time much of his left-hand playing has been done with a stick.

Awards and honors
In 1991 Hidalgo received a Grammy Award for his contribution to the album Planet Drum (Rykodisc, 1991), performed by an ensemble of the same name led by Mickey Hart of The Grateful Dead. He played on another one of Hart's Grammy-winning albums, Global Drum Project and on the album Danzón (Dance On) (GRP, 1993) by Arturo Sandoval which won the 1995 Grammy Award for Best Latin Jazz Performance. Hands of Rhythm (RMM, 1997), Hidalgo's album with Michel Camilo, received a Grammy nomination, as did The Body Acoustic (Chesky, 2004), al album recorded by Hidalgo, David Chesky, Randy Brecker, Bob Mintzer, and Andy Gonzalez.

In May 2010, Hidalgo was awarded an Honorary Doctorate of Music from Berklee College of Music during the sixteenth consecutive year that faculty members from the school visited Puerto Rico for one of its global outreach programs.

Discography

As leader
 1992 Villa Hidalgo (Pimienta)
 1993 Worldwide (RMM)
 1995 Time Shifter (RMM)
 1997 Hands of Rhythm (RMM)
 1999 Best Friends (Sony)

As sideman
With Zaperoko
 1984 - Still Crazy (Montuno)
 1986 - Tarde en la Noche (Zap's)
 2006 - Zaperoko 3 (Libertad)

With Batacumbele
 1981 - Con Un Poco De Songo (Disco Hit)
 1987 - Afro Caribbean Jazz (Montuno)
 1988 - In Concert: Live at the University of Puerto Rico (Montuno)

With Dave Valentin
 1987 - Mind Time (GRP)
 1988 - Live at the Blue Note (GRP)

With Kip Hanrahan
 1985 - Few Short Notes From the End Run (Justin Time)
 1990 - Tenderness (Yellowbird)
 1995 - All Roads Are Made of the Flesh (American Clave)

With Airto Moreira
 1986 - Aqui Se Puede (Montuno)
 1989 - Samba De Flora (Montuno)
 2000 - Homeless
 2003 - Life After That (Narada)

With Hilton Ruiz
 1992 - Manhattan Mambo Soundtrack (Telarc)
 1992 - Live at Birdland (Candid)
 1995 - Hands on Percussion (RMM)

With Paquito D'Rivera
 1987 - Celebration (Columbia)
 1990 - Reunion (Termidor)

With Eddie Palmieri
 1984 -Palo Pá Rumba (Fania)
 1985 -Solito (Fania)
 1987 -The Truth-La Verdad (Fania)
 2005 - Listen Here!  (Concord)

With Jazz Hamilton
 2008 -My Soul (Akoustik)

With The Brian Lynch / Eddie Palmieri Project
 2006 - Simpático (ArtistShare)

With Tito Puente
 1992 - Live at the Village Gate (Tropi Jazz)
 1993 - Golden Latin Jazz All Stars in Session (RMM)
 2002 - Live at the Playboy Jazz Festival (Playboy Jazz)

With Mickey Hart
 1991 - Planet Drum (Rykodisc)
 1998 - Supralingua (Rykodisc)
 1996 - Mickey Hart's Mystery Box (Rykodisc)
 2009 - Global Drum Project (Shout! Factory)
 2012 - Mysterium Tremendum (360° Productions)
 2022 - In the Groove (Valley Entertainment)

With Flora Purim
 1992 - Queen of the Night(Sound Wave)
 1994 - Speed of Light (Meltdown/B&W)
 2002 - Flora Purim Sings Milton Nascimento (Narada)
 2005 - Flora's Song (Narada)

With Humberto Ramirez
 1992 - Jazz Project (Tropi Jazz)
 1993 - Aspects (RMM)
 1999 - Best Friends (Sony Discos)

With Michel Camilo
 1994 - One More Once (Columbia)
 2011 - Mano a Mano (EmArcy/Pgd)

With Freddie Hubbard
 1991 - Bolivia (Musicmasters)
 1998 - God Bless the Child (Musicmasters)

With Dizzy Gillespie
 1989 - Live at the Royal Festival Hall (Enja)
 2007 - Live at the Jazz Plaza Festival 1985 (MVD)

With McCoy Tyner
 1999 - McCoy Tyner & The Latin All-Stars (Telarc)
 2007 - Afro Blue (Telarc)

With Jerry Rivera
 1990 - Abriendo Puertas (Discos CBS)
 2009 - DOS Clasicos (Sony)

With others
 1986 - Word Up! - Cameo (Mercury)
 1992 - Pintando Lunas - Domingo Quiñones (RMM)
 1993 - Heroes - Hilton Ruiz (Telarc)
 1993 - Danzon (Dance On) - Arturo Sandoval (GRP)
 1996 - Evolucionando - Johnny Almendra (RMM)
 1997 - Marching to Mars - Sammy Hagar (Universal)
 1998 - Larry Harlow's Latin Legend Band - Larry Harlow (Sony Discos)
 1998 - Antiguo - Gonzalo Rubalcaba (Blue Note)
 1998 - Havana Blues - Armando Rodriguez (Palmetto)
 2000 - Rhythms for a New Millennium - Alex Acuña (Tonga)
 2000 - Best Kept Secret - Ralph Irizarry (Shanachie)
 2000 - Conga Kings - Candido Camero (Chesky)
 2000 - Galeria Caribe - Ricardo Arjona (Sony)
 2000 - Imprint - John Patitucci (Concord Jazz)
 2000 - Voodoo - D'Angelo (Cheeba/Virgin)
 2001 - Yo Por Ti - Olga Tañón (Warner Bros.)
 2001 - TNT (Trombone-N-Tenor) - Steve Turre (Telarc)
 2001 - Jazz Descargas - Conga Kings (Chesky)
 2002 - Mondo Head - Kodo (Red Ink)
 2002 - Together Again - Juan Pablo Torres (MusicHaus)
 2002 - Lo Bueno De La Vida - Orlando Poleo (Sony)
 2004 - Body Acoustic - Body Acoustic (Chesky)
 2004 - Desahogo - Vico-C (EMI)
 2004 - My Music, My Friends, My Time - Oskar Cartaya (O.Y.E.)
 2004 - Como Nunca...Como Siempre - Limi-T 21 (EMI Latin)
 2005 - Sabor Cubano - Alina Izquierdo (Pimienta)
 2006 - Descarga En California - Rebeca Mauleon (Pimienta)
 2006 - Masa Con Masa - Millo Torres (Machete)
 2006 - Codes - Ignacio Berroa (Blue Note)
 2006 - Telegrafia Sin Hilo - Changuito (Cacao Musica)
 2007 - De Corazon A Corazon - Team Vip (Union Music Group)
 2007 - Jazz, Baby! - Doug Beavers (Origin)
 2007 - En Primera Plana - Issac Delgado (La Calle)
 2007 - 90 Millas - Gloria Estefan (Solar Music Group)
 2008 - Canto a America Latina - Andres Jimenez (Cuatro Menguante)

Filmography
1995 - Conga Virtuoso (DVD) Warner Bros. 
1996 - In The Tradition (DVD) Warner Bros. 
2004 - Traveling Through Time (with Horacio Hernandez) (DVD) Music Video Distributors

See also

List of Puerto Ricans

References

1963 births
Living people
American percussionists
Drummers
Jazz percussionists
Latin jazz percussionists
Conga players
Barril players
Plenera players
Puerto Rican educators
Puerto Rican musicians
musicians from San Juan, Puerto Rico
Planet Drum members
Djembe players
Batá drummers
Timbaleros
Bongo players
Marimbists
Timpanists
Tubular bells players
Tambourine players
Güiro players